The Enshū Railway Line, officially the , is a Japanese railway line in Shizuoka Prefecture, running north from Shin Hamamatsu, Naka Ward through Nishi Kajima, Tenryū Ward, all within Hamamatsu. This is the only railway line Enshū Railway (Entetsu) operates. The line has a nickname , while locals often call it Akaden (あかでん, "The Red Train"), referring to the color of the EMUs. The line accepts NicePass, a smart card ticketing system, as well as ET Card, a magnetic card ticketing system.

Railway signalling on this line is automatic.

History
The line opened as 762mm gauge in 1909, and was converted to 1067mm gauge and electrified at 600 VDC in 1923.

The voltage was increased to 750 VDC in 1961, and CTC signalling was commissioned between Nishi Kajima and Hachiman in 1967, and extended to Shin Hamamatsu in 1974.

Freight services ceased in 1976.

Former connecting lines
 Hamakita station - The Far West Railway Co. opened a 4 km 762mm gauge line to Miyaguchi in 1924, and merged with the Enshu Railway Co. in 1928. The line closed in 1937.

Stations
All stations are within Hamamatsu, Shizuoka.

In Popular Culture
Enshū Railway Line is the setting of the Japanese Urban Legend "Kisaragi Station".

See also
Kanzanji Ropeway
List of railway lines in Japan

References
This article incorporates material from the corresponding article in the Japanese Wikipedia

External links 

  Enshū Railway official website

Railway lines in Japan
Rail transport in Shizuoka Prefecture
Transport in Hamamatsu
Railway lines opened in 1909
Railway lines opened in 1927
1067 mm gauge railways in Japan
750 V DC railway electrification